The steamship Leona operated from 1899 to 1912 on the Willamette River in the U.S. state of Oregon.  This vessel was original launched under the name McMinnville in 1899, and should not be confused with an earlier vessel named McMinnville, which ran on the Willamette River from 1877 to 1881.

Construction
Leona / McMinville was built in 1899, at the shipyard of Joseph Supple at Portland, Oregon. The vessel was a sternwheeler driven by twin-single cylinder horizontally mounted steam engines.

Acquisition by Yellow Stack Line 
In 1901  the vessel was acquired by the Graham family, rebuilt and renamed Leona.  The Graham steamboat line, formally called the Oregon City Transportation Company, but also known as the "Yellow Stack Line".  All the steamers of the line had names that ended in -ona: Latona, Ramona, Altona, Leona, Pomona, Oregona, and Grahamona.

Operations on Willamette River
Leona ran on the Willamette River, including south of Willamette Falls.

Operations on the Lewis River 
In the early part of the 1900s, transportation on the Lewis River, a tributary of the Columbia River downriver from Vancouver, Washington, was dominated by the Lewis River Transportation Company, in which a prominent businessman Jacob Kamm was interested.  By 1904, Leona was brought on as an opposition boat, which generated at least one favorable comment in the press at the time:
{{blockquote|The Kamm Co. (Lewis River Transportation Co.) service has been the poorest that ever ran on this river since the SWALLOW and HYDRA ran on it. If you know what side your bread is buttered on and have any sympathy for your neighbors, patronize the opposition boat LEONA at the foot of Oak Street Portland. If the people don't patronize it they ought to be compelled to walk to Ridgefield to the Railroad if they go at all.<ref>The Vancouver "Independent", December 8, 1904, as quoted in Card, Judy, Fields of Flowers ..." at Lewis River.com</ref>}}

Loss by fire
In 1912, Leona burned on the Lewis river near what is now the modern town of La Center, Washington.  The wreck of the Leona is still visible on the Lewis River at low water during July and August.  The wreck site is reported to be on the west side of the Lewis River bridge at La Center, Washington.

See also
Steamboats of the Columbia River

Notes

 References 
 Affleck, Edward L., A Century of Paddlewheelers in the Pacific Northwest, the Yukon, and Alaska, Alexander Nicholls Press, Vancouver, BC 2000 
 Card, Judy, Fields of Flowers and Forests of Firs: A History of the Woodland Community 1850-1958  (self-published) (excerpts relating to personal and newspaper accounts of steam navigation on the Lewis River available on-line at Lewis River.com).
 Mills, Randall V., Sternwheelers up Columbia, Univ. of Nebraska (1947; 1977 printing) 
 Newell, Gordon R., ed., H.W. McCurdy Marine History of the Pacific Northwest, at 48, Superior Publishing, Seattle, WA 1966
 Timmen, Fritz Blow for the Landing: A Hundred Years of Steam Navigation on the Waters of the West, Caxton Printers, Caldwell, ID 1973 

 Further reading 
 Corning, Howard McKinley, Willamette Landings'', Oregon Historical Society (2d Ed. 1973)

External links 

Steamboats of Oregon
Steamboats of the Willamette River
Steamboats of the Columbia River
Passenger ships of the United States
Ships built in Portland, Oregon
1899 ships
Transportation buildings and structures in Clark County, Washington
Shipwrecks of the Columbia River system
Oregon City Transportation Company
Ships built by Joseph Supple